Hilde Maroff (5 June 1904 – 15 August 1984) was a German stage and film actress. She was the mother of the child actor Peter Bosse.

Selected filmography
 Kubinke the Barber (1926)
 Love's Joys and Woes (1926)
 Sister Veronika (1927)
 Men Before Marriage (1927)
 Marie's Soldier (1927)
 The Awakening of Woman (1927)
 Tough Guys, Easy Girls (1927)
 Miss Chauffeur (1927)
 The Cavalier from Wedding (1927)
 The Pirates of the Baltic Sea (1927)
 Flirtation (1927)
 The Three Women of Urban Hell (1928)
 Sir or Madam (1928)
 Fair Game (1928)
 Cry for Help (1928)
 He Goes Right, She Goes Left! (1928)
 Give Me Life (1928)
 A Mother's Love (1929)
 Street Acquaintances (1929)
 The Happy Vagabonds (1929)
 Three from the Unemployment Office (1932)
 What Women Dream (1933)
 An Ideal Husband (1935)
 Mother Song (1937)
 The Woman at the Crossroads (1938)

References

Bibliography

External links

1904 births
1984 deaths
Actresses from Berlin
German film actresses
German stage actresses